A. K. Khan may refer to:

 Abul Kashem Khan (1905–1991), Bangladeshi lawyer, industrialist and politician
 A K Khan & Company
 A. K. Khan (police officer) (born 1956), IPS officer